Eskimağara is a village in the Nusaybin District of Mardin Province in Turkey. The village is populated by Kurds of the Temikan tribe and had a population of 51 in 2021.

Notable people 

 Musa Anter

References 

Villages in Nusaybin District
Kurdish settlements in Mardin Province